Lambda variant, also known as lineage C.37, is a variant of SARS-CoV-2, the virus that causes COVID-19. It was first detected in Peru in August 2020. On 14 June 2021, the World Health Organization (WHO) named it Lambda variant and designated it as a variant of interest. It has spread to at least 30 countries around the world and is known to be more resistant to neutralizing antibodies compared to other strains. There is  evidence that suggests the Lambda variant is both more infectious and resistant to vaccines than the Alpha and/or Gamma variant.



Mutations 
The Lambda genome has the following amino acid mutations, all of which are in the virus's spike protein code: G75V, T76I, Δ246-252, L452Q, F490S, D614G and T859N.

History
First samples of the Lambda variant were detected in Peru in August 2020 and by April 2021, over eighty percent of new cases of COVID-19 in Peru were from the new variant. In mid-June 2021, 90.6% of new COVID-19 cases in Arequipa and 78.1% of new cases in Cusco were the Lambda variant, according to the Peruvian Ministry of Health. By this time the Lambda variant had also spread throughout South America and was detected in twenty-nine countries in total, especially in Argentina, Chile and Ecuador. The WHO designated the Lambda variant as a "variant of interest" on 14 June 2021.

On 6 July 2021, Australia reported its first case of the Lambda variant in an overseas traveler who had been in a New South Wales quarantine hotel in April.

On 19 July 2021, Texas reported its first case of the Lambda variant. On 22 July 2021, Florida reported 126 cumulative confirmed cases of the Lambda variant. On 28 July 2021, University of Miami researchers announced random sampling showed 3 percent of COVID-19 patients in Jackson Memorial Health System and at University of Miami’s UHealth Tower were infected with it. On 5 August 2021, Louisiana reported its first case of the Lambda variant.

On 7 August 2021, Japan confirmed its first case of the Lambda variant, with the infected person arriving in Japan from Peru on 20 July.

On 15 August 2021, the Philippines confirmed its first case of the Lambda variant.

Statistics

See also

 Variants of SARS-CoV-2: Alpha, Beta, Gamma, Delta, Epsilon, Zeta, Eta, Theta, Iota, Kappa, Mu, Omicron

References

COVID-19 pandemic in Peru
S011